An arbalist, also spelled arbelist, is one who shoots a crossbow.

Background
An extensive list of archaic words for medieval crossbowmen is given by Payne-Gallwey. Richardson, in his 1839 dictionary,  did not make specific reference to the crossbow in his definition of arbalist: "One who casts or shoots from a bow." Hansard (1841) used the word arbalister for a cross-bowman (sic), the same usage as Webster and Johnson who reserved the word arbalist for the crossbow itself. Smith uses arbalist to describe a maker of crossbows.

Equipment and competition
Modern arbalists shoot crossbows markedly different from medieval artillerymen.  Current-day target crossbows must conform to various limitations according to the governing body under which the shoot or tournament is taking place. Firstly, GNAS requires that arbalists shoot at targets separate from archers.  Both the World Crossbow Shooting Association (WCSA) and GNAS require that the draw weight maximum be 95 lbs and that the minimum bolt (arrow) length be 12 inches.  These organizations differ, however, in allowable maximum bolt length, GNAS citing 15", WCSA 18".  They also disagree as to whether metal prods can be used; GNAS says no, WCSA says yes (with restrictions).  Both require that the bolts shall be fletched, GNAS imposing an additional constraint of the number of fletchings (three).

Classification
GNAS recognizes three grades of arbalist, Master Arbalist (scoring 780 or higher in three qualifying Crossbow Windsor Rounds) Arbalist 1st Class (scoring 630 or higher) and Arbalist 2nd Class (480). A Crossbow Windsor Round is shot on a 60 cm 10-zone face scoring 9,7,5,3,1; three ends at 40 yards, three at 50 yards and three at 60 yards.

Archery Australia recognizes five classifications: Grand Master Arbelist (GMA), Master Arbelist (MA), First Class Arbelist (A1), Second Class Arbelist (A2), and Third Class Arbelist (A3).

Awards
The World Crossbow Shooting Association (WCSA) makes available four sets of Star Achievement Awards (badges) to encourage both participation in tournaments and to provide recognition for reaching certain scores: TC 900 for outdoor target crossbow, SC 600 for outdoor sport crossbow, Indoor 40 for indoor 40 cm face for both target and sport crossbow, and Indoor 25 for indoor 25 cm face for both target and sport crossbow.

See also
Archery
Crossbow
Laws on crossbows

References

External links
 
 
 
 
 
 

Crossbows
Archers